The 2016–17 season was Portsmouth's 118th season of existence and their fourth consecutive season in League Two. Along with competing in League Two, the club also participated in the FA Cup, League Cup and Football League Trophy. The season covers the period from 1 July 2016 to 30 June 2017.

Players

Squad details

Transfers

In

Total spending:  £0

Out

Total gaining:  £750,000

Contracts

Player statistics

Squad stats

|-
|colspan="16"|Players on loan to other clubs:

|-
|colspan="16"|Players who have left the club after the start of the season:

|-
|}

Top scorers

Disciplinary record

Competitions

Pre-season friendlies

League Two

League table

Matches

FA Cup

EFL Cup

EFL Trophy

References

Portsmouth
Portsmouth F.C. seasons